Thomas Baxter Hayward (1838 – December 9, 1919) was an American politician and physician. He served as a member of the Maryland House of Delegates, representing Harford County, from 1892 to 1896.

Early life
Thomas Baxter Hayward was born in Rossville, Pennsylvania in 1838. He graduated from Dickinson College. He then graduated with a medical degree from Jefferson College.

Career
Hayward had a medical practice in York, Pennsylvania. After health problems, he moved to Harford County, Maryland.

Hayward was a Democrat. He was a candidate for the Maryland House of Delegates in 1889, but lost to Noble L. Mitchell. Hayward served as a member of the Maryland House of Delegates, representing Harford County, from 1892 to 1896.

Hayward was president of the Cleveland Tariff Reform Club, a political organization.

Personal life
In the 1860s, Hayward moved to Clermont Mills. He married Helen Bussey. They had eight children, including Ferdinand, Francis Sidney, Augustus, Stilley, Eugene H., Helen, Florence and Mrs. A. Maynard Bacon. His son Francis Sidney was a customs officer and deputy collector for the Port of Baltimore. His son Eugene H. was a surgeon in World War I and at the University of Maryland. Later in life, his family moved to Baltimore.

Hayward died on December 9, 1919, at the home of his son in Baltimore. He was buried at St. Mary's Cemetery in Govans, Baltimore.

References

1838 births
1919 deaths
People from York County, Pennsylvania
Dickinson College alumni
Washington & Jefferson College alumni
Democratic Party members of the Maryland House of Delegates
Physicians from Pennsylvania
Physicians from Maryland